Bryan Joseph Rush (2 April 1893 – 11 August 1982) was an Australian rules footballer who played with Collingwood in the Victorian Football League (VFL).

Family
The son of Roger Robert Rush (1856–1941), and Mary Rush (1856–1943), née Berry, Bryan Joseph Rush was born at Port Fairy, Victoria on 2 April 1893.

Wife
He married Lorna McKay in 1927.

Siblings
Four of his seven brothers also played VFL football (They are the only set of five brothers to play in the VFL/AFL):
 Robert Thomas "Bob" Rush (1880–1975) (1890–1983), who played with Collingwood from 1899 to 1908.
 William Leopold "Leo" Rush (1890–1983), who played with Melbourne in 1911, and with Richmond in 1912.
 Gerald Vincent Rush (1895–1988), played with Richmond in 1920.
 Kevin Patrick Rush (1901–1984), played with Richmond in 1923 and 1924.

Football

Collingwood (VFL)
Recruited from the Beverly Football Club in the Metropolitan Amateur Football Association (MAFA) in 1912.

New South Wales
In 1929 he was the honorary coach of the New South Wales side that came from behind to beat Tasmania by one point, at the Sydney Cricket ground on 22 June 1929.

Military service
A Commonwealth public servant with the Treasury Department, he enlisted in the First AIF on 21 September 1914, and served overseas in the Australian Army Pay Corps.

In 1942, by this time a chartered accountant, he enlisted in the Second AIF, and served as the District Finance Officer at the Sydney Barracks, with the rank of Major.

See also
 List of Australian rules football families

Notes

References
 First World War Embarkation Roll: Sergeant Bryan Joseph Rush (22), Australian War Memorial.
 First World War Nominal Roll: Captain Bryan Joseph Rush, Australian War Memorial.
 First World War Service Record: Captain Bryan Joseph Rush, National Archives of Australia.
 
 Bryan Rush, NSW Australian Football History Society.

External links 

 
 Bryan Rush's profile at Collingwood Forever
 

1893 births
1982 deaths
Australian rules footballers from Victoria (Australia)
Collingwood Football Club players
Australian military personnel of World War I
Australian Army personnel of World War II
Australian Army officers
People from Port Fairy
Military personnel from Victoria (Australia)